Chicken & Dumplin's is an album by American jazz pianist Bobby Timmons recorded in 1965 and released on the Prestige label.

Reception
The Allmusic review awarded the album 3 stars.

Track listing
 "Chicken & Dumplin's" (Ray Bryant) – 7:45
 "The Return of Gengis Khan" (Bobby Timmons)– 14:15
 "The Telephone Song" (Roberto Menescal, Ronaldo Boscoli, Norman Gimbel) – 4:25
 "A Sunday Kind of Love" (Barbara Belle, Anita Leonard, Louis Prima, Stanley Rhodes) – 6:15
 "Ray's Idea" (Dizzy Gillespie, Gil Fuller) – 8:38

Personnel
Bobby Timmons – piano, vibes
Mickey Bass – bass
Billy Saunders – drums

References

Prestige Records albums
Bobby Timmons albums
1965 albums
Albums recorded at Van Gelder Studio
Albums produced by Cal Lampley